Peterson/Petersen is a Scandinavian patronymic surname meaning "son of Peter." The given name Peter is derived from the Greek πέτρος (petros), meaning "rock" or "stone," and has been a popular name choice throughout history for the Christian apostle Peter. The surname is most commonly found in European countries such as Sweden, Denmark, Germany, Holland, and Brussels in the northwestern region. There are an estimated 700 variant spellings of the surname. The form Peterson may also have arisen from Danish Petersen with a change of spelling commonly applied by Danish immigrants to English-speaking countries. On another note, the surname Peterson is native to Sweden; therefore, Peterson is the correct spelling from that country.

List of people with this surname
 Adrian Peterson (born 1985), American football running back
 Adrian N. Peterson (born 1979), American football running back
 Amanda Peterson (1971–2015), American actress
 Andrew Peterson (disambiguation), multiple people
 Ann Peterson (born 1947), American Olympic diver
 Arthur Peterson (disambiguation), multiple people
 Brian Peterson (disambiguation), multiple people
 Carla Peterson (actress) (born 1974), Argentinian actress
 Cassandra Peterson (born 1951), American actress best known for her screen persona "Elvira"
 Charles Gilbert Peterson (1848–1918), American Contractor and Mayor former of Lockport, NY
 Christine Peterson, American forecaster
 Clark Peterson,(born 1966), film producer
 Chip Peterson, (born 1987), American swimmer
 Collin Peterson (born 1944), American politician, congressman from Minnesota 
 Coyote Peterson (born 1981) American Youtuber and Brave Wilderness Presenter
 D. J. Peterson (born 1991), American baseball player
 Dan Peterson (born 1936), American basketball coach
 Daniel Peterson, American physician in private practice in the state of Nevada
 Daniel C. Peterson, Professor of Islamic Studies and Arabic in the Department of Asian and Near Eastern Languages at Brigham Young University
 Dave Peterson (ice hockey) (1931–1997), American ice hockey coach
 David Peterson (disambiguation), multiple people
 Daystar Peterson (born 1992), Canadian rapper and singer known professionally as Tory Lanez
 Debbi Peterson (born 1961), American singer
 Denis Peterson, American painter
 Donald H. Peterson (1933–2018), former American NASA astronaut
 Donna C. Peterson (born 1946), American politician and educator
 Dorothy Peterson (1897–1979), American actress
 Doug Peterson (1945–2017), American yacht designer
 Drew Peterson (born 1954), American former Illinois police sergeant and convicted murderer
 Dustin Peterson (born 1994), American baseball player
 Dutton S. Peterson (1894–1964), New York clergyman and politician
 Elly M. Peterson (1914–2008) American, Michigan politician
 Elmer Peterson, American farmer and politician
 Elmer Peter Peterson (1904-1979), American electrician and politician
 Eric Peterson (born 1946), Canadian actor
 Eric Peterson (musician) (born 1964), American guitarist
 Erik Peterson (theologian) (1890–1960), German theologian
 Esther Peterson (1906–1997), American, Assistant Secretary of Labor
 Eugene H. Peterson (1932–2018), American Presbyterian minister, scholar, theologian, author, and poet
 Frank Peterson (born 1963), German music producer
 Franklin P. Peterson (1930–2000), American mathematician
 Frederick Peterson (neurologist) (1859–1938), American neurologist, psychiatrist, and poet
 George P. "Bud" Peterson (born 1952), president, Georgia Institute of Technology
 Gil Peterson (born 1936), American actor and singer
 Gilbert Peterson (1824–1890), American Contractor
 Gilles Peterson (born 1964), English DJ
 Gordon Peterson, American broadcast journalist
 Halvor H. Peterson (1831–1917), American farmer and politician
 Hattie Peterson (1930–2017), All-American Girls Professional Baseball League player
 Jace Peterson (born 1990), American baseball player
 Jeret Peterson (1981–2011), American aerial skier
 Jerome P. Peterson (1936–2018), American educator and politician
 Jesse Peterson (1850–1921), American Industrialist and Presidential Elector
 Jim Peterson (born 1941), Canadian politician
 John Peterson (disambiguation), multiple people
 Jordan Peterson (born 1962), Canadian psychologist, professor, academic, author and motivational speaker
 Kandi Peterson (born 1981), American singer of dutch roots
 Keith Peterson (born 1956), Canadian politician
 Kevin Peterson (American football) (born 1994), American football player
 Kristjan Jaak Peterson (1801–1822), Estonian poet
 Laci Peterson (1975–2002), American, murdered wife of Scott Peterson
 Lenka Peterson (1925-2021), American actress
 Liza Jessie Peterson, American playwright, actor, activist, and educator
 Lynn Peterson, American politician
 Lynn Peterson, Canadian, mayor of Thunder Bay, Ontario
 Maggie Peterson (1941-2022), American actress
 Mark Peterson (disambiguation), several people
 Martha Peterson (born 1945)
 Maurice Peterson (1889–1952), British diplomat
 Michael Peterson (disambiguation)
 Morris Peterson (born 1977), American basketball player
 Norm Peterson (politician) (born 1939), Australian politician
 Olive Peterson (1894–1965), American bridge player
 Oscar Peterson (1925–2007), Canadian jazz pianist and composer
 Oscar V. Peterson (1899–1942), American seaman in the US Navy
 Patrick Peterson (born 1990), American football player
 Peter George Peterson (1926–2018), businessman, author, and politician
 Peter Peterson, 19th century Wisconsin merchant
 Pete Peterson (1929–2019), baseball player
 Pete Peterson (born 1935), American POW, US Congressman from Florida, and later ambassador to Vietnam
 Peter Peterson (born 1953), former Canadian Member of Parliament
 Pete Peterson (1903–1962), American motion picture special effects and stop-motion animation pioneer*
 Ralph Peterson (1962–2021), American jazz drummer and bandleader
 Randolph W. Peterson (born 1953), American politician and judge
 Ray Peterson (1939–2005), American pop singer
 Rebecca Peterson (born 1995), Swedish tennis player
 Robin Peterson (born 1979), South African cricketer
 Roger Peterson (musician), Aruban-Dutch musician
 Roger Peterson (pilot) (1937–1959), pilot of the plane that crashed killing Buddy Holly, Ritchie Valens and Jiles Perry Richardson
 Roger Tory Peterson (1908–1996), American naturalist, ornithologist, artist, and educator
 Ronnie Peterson (1944–1978), Swedish racing driver
 Russell W. Peterson (1916–2011), American engineer and politician, governor of Delaware
 Scott Peterson (born 1972), American convicted murderer
 Shelley Peterson (born 1952), Canadian actress
 Stephen Peterson (rower) (born 1963), American world champion rower in 1990, 1996 Olympian
 Thalia Gouma-Peterson (1933–2001), American professor
 Thomas Mundy Peterson (1824–1904), first African-American to vote in an election
 Thorleif T. Peterson (1885–1982), American farmer and politician
 Todd Peterson (place kicker) (born 1970), American football player
 Trudy Huskamp Peterson (born 1945), American historian, former acting Archivist of the United States
 Vadal Peterson (1892–1976), American college sports coach
 Val Peterson (1903–1983), American, governor of Nebraska
 Vicki Peterson (born 1958), American pop musician
 Walter R. Peterson, Jr. (1922–2011), governor of New Hampshire
 W. Wesley Peterson (1924–2009), American mathematician and computer scientist
 William Peterson (academic) (1856–1921), Scottish Latinist and classical scholar

Fictional characters with this surname 
 Cora Peterson, a character in the 1966 science fiction film Fantastic Voyage
 Chris Peterson, the main character from the American TV sitcom Get a Life (1990–1992)
 Fred and Gladys Peterson, characters from the American TV sitcom Get a Life (1990–1992)
 Lindsay Peterson, character in the television series Queer as Folk
 Minty Peterson, character in EastEnders
 Norm Peterson, character on the American sitcom television series Cheers
 Penny, Patty, and Paul Peterson, characters in the 2014 computer animated film Mr. Peabody & Sherman
 Ray Peterson, character portrayed by Tom Hanks in The 'Burbs
 Sloane Peterson, character portrayed by Mia Sara in Ferris Bueller's Day Off
 Stinky Peterson, character on Animated TV Show Hey Arnold!.

References

English-language surnames
Patronymic surnames
Surnames from given names